Agustin Murillo Pineda (born May 5, 1982) is a Mexican professional baseball infielder for the Rieleros de Aguascalientes of the Mexican League. He has played in Nippon Professional Baseball for the Tohoku Rakuten Golden Eagles.

Career
Murillo was signed by the Arizona Diamondbacks as an undrafted free agent in 2002 for the baseball legend Jack Pierce. In 2007, Murillo was loaned to the Dorados de Chihuahua of the Mexican League. In 2008, he was loaned to the Sultanes de Monterrey of the Mexican League, where he was a candidate for Most Valuable Player. On May 15, 2009, Murillo was suspended 50 games after testing positive for the performance-enhancing substance Clenbuterol. On November 9, 2009, he elected free agency. At the time, Murillo had a career .275/.344/.399 batting line with 36 home runs and 236 RBI in 514 minor league games.

On March 16, 2010, Murillo signed with the Sultanes de Monterrey of the Mexican League. He played in 99 games that season, batting .293/.392/.432 with 7 home runs and 48 RBI. In 2011 with Monterrey, Murillo slashed .301/.389/.438 with 11 home runs and 58 RBI. The next season he batted .282/.359/.416  with 10 home runs and 55 RBI. Appearing in 108 games in 2013, Murillo had a torrid batting line of .337/.427/.478 to go along with 10 home runs and 56 RBI. In 2014, Murillo hit .340/.417/.583 with a career-high 24 home runs and 95 RBI. In 2015, Murillo batted .279/.347/.420 with 11 home runs and 58 RBI before being released on August 6. After his release, Murillo signed with the Tohoku Rakuten Golden Eagles of Nippon Professional Baseball. Murillo played in 9 games for the Eagles, slashing .313/.405/.344 with 1 RBI. On April 1, 2016, Murillo returned to Monterrey, and batted .303/.377/.419 on the year. The next season, Murillo slashed .287/.370/.397 with 5 home runs and 23 RBI in only 58 games. In 2018, Murillo notched 16 home runs and 70 RBI in 398 at-bats. In the 2019 season, Murillo appeared in 108 games for Monterrey, batting .294/.365/.444 with 13 home runs and 17 RBI. Murillo did not play in a game in 2020 due to the cancellation of the LMB season because of the COVID-19 pandemic.

On April 16, 2021, Murillo was loaned to the Bravos de León of the Mexican League. On June 27, Murillo was loaned back to the Sultanes de Monterrey.

On September 27, 2021, Murillo, along with IF Amadeo Zazueta and P Nick Struck, were traded to the Toros de Tijuana of the Mexican League.

On December 30, 2022, Murillo was traded to the Rieleros de Aguascalientes of the Mexican League in exchange for IF Marc Flores.

References

External links

1982 births
Living people
Águilas de Mexicali players
Baseball players at the 2011 Pan American Games
Baseball players from Baja California
Bravos de León players
Dorados de Chihuahua players
Mexican expatriate baseball players in the United States
Mexican expatriate baseball players in Japan
Mexican League baseball third basemen
Missoula Osprey players
Mobile BayBears players
Nippon Professional Baseball shortstops
Nippon Professional Baseball third basemen
Reno Aces players
Sportspeople from Tijuana
South Bend Silver Hawks players
Sultanes de Monterrey players
Tennessee Smokies players
Tohoku Rakuten Golden Eagles players
Toros de Tijuana players
Yaquis de Obregón players
2009 World Baseball Classic players
Pan American Games competitors for Mexico